Alberto Fontana may refer to:
Alberto Fontana (painter) (died 1558), painter from Modena
Alberto Fontana (footballer, born 1967), Italian goalkeeper
Alberto Fontana (footballer, born 1974), Italian goalkeeper